The 2007 FC Rubin Kazan season was the club's 5th season in the Russian Premier League, the highest tier of association football in Russia. They finished the season in tenth position.

Season review

Squad

On loan

Left club during season

Transfers

In

Loans in

Out

Loans out

Released

Competitions

Premier League

Results by round

Results

League table

Russian Cup

2006-07

2007-08

UEFA Intertoto Cup

Qualifying rounds

Squad statistics

Appearances and goals

|-
|colspan="14"|Players away from the club on loan:

|-
|colspan="14"|Players who appeared for Rubin Kazan but left during the season:

|}

Goal scorers

Disciplinary record

References

FC Rubin Kazan seasons
Rubin Kazan